Johann Friedrich Wilhelm Baucke (7 July 1848–6 June 1931) was a New Zealand linguist, ethnologist, journalist and interpreter. He was born in Chatham Islands, New Zealand on 7 July 1848.

References

1848 births
1931 deaths
Linguists from New Zealand
New Zealand journalists
Interpreters
New Zealand ethnologists